DuPont High School was a public high school in Dupont City, West Virginia, about 5 miles from Charleston. Built in 1961 and opened in 1962 it remained the home of the Panthers until closing in 1999 to consolidate with nearby East Bank High forming Riverside High School.

Notable alumni

 Bobbie Howard NFL Linebacker
 Randy Moss NFL receiver
 Jason Williams NBA Guard

References

Schools in Kanawha County, West Virginia
Educational institutions established in 1962
1962 establishments in West Virginia
Educational institutions disestablished in 1999
1999 disestablishments in the United States